Francesco I (25 March 1541 – 19 October 1587) was the second Grand Duke of Tuscany, ruling from 1574 until his death in 1587. He was a member of the House of Medici.

Biography 

Born in Florence, Francesco was the son of Cosimo I de' Medici, Grand Duke of Tuscany, and Eleanor of Toledo. He served as regent for his father Cosimo after he retired from his governing duties in 1564.

Marriage to Joanna of Austria 
On 18 December 1565, Francesco married Joanna of Austria, youngest daughter of Holy Roman Emperor Ferdinand I and his wife Anne of Bohemia and Hungary. By all reports, it was not a happy marriage. Joanna was homesick for her native Austria, and Francesco was neither charming nor faithful. In 1578, Joanna died at the age of thirty-one, after falling down a flight of stairs while pregnant with their eighth child.

Bianca Cappello 
Soon after Grand Duchess Joanna had died, Francesco went on to marry his Venetian mistress, Bianca Cappello, after aptly disposing of her husband, a Florentine bureaucrat. Because of the quick remarriage and similar occurrences among the Medici (Francesco's younger brother Pietro had reportedly killed his wife), rumours spread that Francesco and Bianca had conspired to poison Joanna. Francesco reportedly built and decorated the Villa di Pratolino for Bianca. She was, however, not always popular among Florentines. They had no legitimate children, but Bianca had borne him a son, Antonio (29 August 1576 – 2 May 1621), in his first wife's lifetime. Following the death of Francesco's legitimate son Filippo in 1582, Antonio was proclaimed heir. Francesco also adopted Bianca's daughter by her first marriage, Pellegrina (1564–?).

Like his father, Francesco was often despotic, but while Cosimo had known how to maintain Florentine independence, Francesco acted more like a vassal of the Habsburgs of Austria and Spain. He continued the heavy taxation of his subjects to pay large sums to the empire.

Francesco had an avid interest in manufacturing and sciences. He founded porcelain and stoneware manufacture, but these did not thrive until after his death. He continued his father's patronage of the arts, supporting artists and building the Medici Theater as well as founding the Accademia della Crusca. Francesco was also passionately interested in chemistry and alchemy and spent many hours in his private laboratory and curio collection, the Studiolo in the Palazzo Vecchio, which held his collections of natural items and stones and allowed him to dabble in chemistry and alchemical schemes.

Francesco and Bianca died on 19 and 20 October, both at the Medici Villa in Poggio a Caiano. Although the original death certificates mention malaria, it has been widely speculated that the couple was poisoned, possibly by Francesco's brother Ferdinando. While some early forensic research supported the latter theory, forensic evidence from a study in 2010 found the parasite Plasmodium falciparum, which causes malaria, in the skeletal remains of Francesco I, which strongly bolstered the infection theory and the credibility of the official documents. Francesco was succeeded by his younger brother Ferdinando.

In 1857, all members of the Medici family were exhumed and reburied in the place where they still lie today, the Basilica of St. Lawrence in Florence. The painter Giuseppe Moricci attended the ceremony and depicted Francesco with a facial droop, a right claw hand appearance, the right shoulder internally rotated, the right calf muscle wasted and a right clubfoot confirmed by orthopaedic footwear within the coffin. These are the signs of a right-sided stroke possibly within the internal capsule. The presence of the orthopaedic footwear suggests that this stroke happened significantly before his death. During life, in his official portraits, the grand duke was always depicted as being in perfect physical condition. The cause of his stroke is not known, but malaria is known to cause this condition.

There is a famous portrait of Francesco as a child by Bronzino that hangs in the Uffizi Gallery in Florence. Francesco's marriage to Bianca and the couple's death was exploited by Thomas Middleton for his tragedy Women Beware Women, published in 1658.

Children 
Francesco and Joanna had eight children:

 Eleonora (28 February 1567 – 9 September 1611), who married Vincenzo Gonzaga, Duke of Mantua (1562–1612)
 Romola (20 November 1568 – 2 December 1568)
 Anna (31 December 1569 – 19 February 1584)
 Isabella (30 September 1571 – 8 August 1572)
 Lucrezia (7 November 1572 – 14 August 1574)
 Marie (26 April 1575–3 July 1642), who became Queen of France by her marriage to Henry IV in 1600
 Filippo (20 May 1577 – 29 March 1582)
 a son, died in a miscarriage

In fiction
 Francesco de' Medici is a secondary character in John Webster's 1612 play The White Devil

References

Sources

External links 

 "The Medici Archive Project", from the Medici Archive Project
 "The Medici Archive Project Bio Page"
 "Toledo-de' Medici, Leonor de (Eleonora)", from The Medici Archive Project
 "Osorio Pimentel, María", from The Medici Archive Project
 , from Medieval Lands Project''

1541 births
1587 deaths
Nobility from Florence
Francesco 1
Francesco 1
16th-century Italian nobility
Francesco
Regents of Tuscany
Burials at San Lorenzo, Florence
Italian art patrons
Deaths from malaria